Thliptoceras filamentosum is a moth in the family Crambidae. It was described by Zhang in 2014. It is found in China in Jiangxi and Guangdong.

The wingspan is 20–22 mm. The wings are yellow brown, gradually deepening from the postmedial line to the termen. The markings are fuscous.

Etymology
The species name refers to the thread-like wrinkles in the vesica and is derived from Latin filamentosus (meaning thread like).

References

Moths described in 2014
Pyraustinae